A guessing game is a game in which the object is to guess some kind of information, such as a word, a phrase, a title, or the location of an object.

Guessing Game or The Guessing Game may also refer to:

 The Guessing Game, an album by the band Cathedral
 "Guessing Game", a song by Elzhi from The Preface (2008)
 "Guessing Game", an episode of the television series Teletubbies
 "Guessing Game", a season 2 episode of Simon & Simon
Guessing Game, the 1993 winner of the Queen's Cup (SAJC)
 "Guessing Game", a series 4 episode of The Bill
 "Guessing Games", a song from the 1982 Hall & Oates album H2O

See also 
 "Our Guessing Game", a song by the Moody Blues from Every Good Boy Deserves Favour (1971)